Vera Steadman (June 23, 1900 – December 14, 1966) was an American film actress of the silent era. Steadman was born on June 23, 1900, in Monterey, California.

Before she began working in films, Steadman was experienced as a swimmer, high diver, and classic dancer.

Steadman appeared in more than 90 films between 1915 and 1941, in her first years appearing as one of the Sennett Bathing Beauties. She worked for Fox for four months before joining Universal, and she later made films for Christie Film Company. 

Her marriage to orchestra leader Jackie Taylor ended in divorce on June 14, 1923. On April 17, 1935, she married Martin Padway in Van Nuys. They were divorced on August 8, 1938. She married Joseph Milton Flynn in November, 1948, and they remained wed until her death. On December 14, 1966, Steadman died at age 65.  She was buried at Forest Lawn Memorial Park (Long Beach).

Filmography

References

External links

1900 births
1966 deaths
American film actresses
American silent film actresses
Actresses from California
People from Monterey, California
20th-century American actresses
Burials at Forest Lawn Memorial Park (Long Beach)